Amarjeet Kushwaha is an Indian activist, lawyer and politician. He was elected as member of Bihar legislative assembly in 2020 from 106th Ziradei constituency. He is a leader in the Communist Party of India (Marxist–Leninist) Liberation. He was the national president of the Revolutionary Youth Association in India. In 2020 he defeated his near rival Kamla Devi from Ziradei seat with a margin of more than 25000 votes.

Personal life and education 
Amarjeet Kushwaha was brought up in the Siwan district of Bihar. He attended the M.M.M. PG College, Bhatparrani, Deoria and graduated with a Bachelor of Arts degree. Later he got a graduation for a second time with a Bachelor of Laws degree from Gorakhpur University. Kushwaha is married to Maya Devi.

Activism 
During his course in Gorakhpur University, Kushwaha joined the Communist Party of India (Marxist–Leninist) Liberation. After completing his course in Uttar Pradesh, he returned to Siwan as a party activist. In Siwan, Kushwaha became an activist for farmers' and dalits' rights and stepped in to intervene to assure protection of the rights of Dalits when in 2013 upper caste landlords of the region attempted to attack them with the help from a Bhartiya Janata Party MLA. He was reported to have become a rival of Mohammad Shahabuddin due to his activism. He has been involved in agitations for poor farmers in getting possession of their land.

In 2007, he became the state president of the Revolutionary Youth Association and then its national president in 2010. He was elected to the state committee of the Communist Party of India (Marxist–Leninist) Liberation in 2012. He was also nominated to contest the 2015 Bihar Legislative Assembly election from the Ziradei constituency. Following the nomination, he was arrested in the case of a land dispute and later released in 2016. It was alleged that the arrest had been made on the behest of Mohammad Shahabuddin.  During the 2019 Indian general election, Kushwaha worked for the campaign of Amarnath Yadav in the Siwan constituency.

References 

Living people
1973 births
Activists from Bihar
Communist Party of India (Marxist–Leninist) Liberation politicians
Bihar MLAs 2020–2025